Kukeč (Prekmurje Slovene: Kükeč) is a small settlement in the Municipality of Gornji Petrovci in the Prekmurje region of Slovenia.

References

External links
Kukeč on Geopedia

Populated places in the Municipality of Gornji Petrovci